The Cathedral of the Immaculate Conception is the main Roman Catholic church building of Minas, Uruguay. It was the see of the Roman Catholic Diocese of Minas from 1960 till 2020.

Built in Neoclassical style, it was consecrated in 1892. It is dedicated to the Immaculate Conception of the Virgin Mary.

Same devotion
There are many other churches in Uruguay dedicated to the Immaculate Conception:
 Church of the Immaculate Conception in Rivera

 Cathedral of the Immaculate Conception, St. Philip and St. James in Montevideo

See also
 List of Roman Catholic cathedrals in Uruguay
 Roman Catholic Diocese of Minas

References

External links
 
 Diocese of Minas - CEU 

Religion in Lavalleja Department
Buildings and structures in Lavalleja Department
Minas
Roman Catholic churches completed in 1892
19th-century Roman Catholic church buildings in Uruguay
Neoclassical church buildings in Uruguay